Izman may refer to:
 Izman-e Bala